Events from 2005 in Switzerland.

Events
Public holidays in one or several cantons of Switzerland are marked (¹).

January
January 1: New Year's Day¹
January 2: Berchtoldstag¹
January 6: Epiphany¹
January 13: Silvesterkläuse in Urnäsch, custom on New Year's Eve according to the Julian calendar.
January 14–16: Lauberhorn Alpine Skiing World Cup race in Wengen: Michael Walchhofer finished first.
January 24–30: 40th Solothurn Film Festival 
January 26–30: World Economic Forum in Davos

February

Scheduled events
(As of February 2, 2005)

February
February 3–8: Fasnacht in Lucerne, carnival 
February 5: L'Hom Strom custom in Scuol
February 14–16: Fasnacht in Basel, carnival 
February 18–27: Muba in Basel 
February 27: Sunday for Votes and elections (at least quarterly ): Federal votes and cantonal elections for parliaments of AG and SO, executive of AR, NW, LU, SO, ZH.
February 28-March 18: Federal Parliament spring session

March
March 1: Chalandamarz custom in Engadin and other parts of the Grisons
March 1: Proclamation of the Republic¹ in Neuchâtel
March 3–13: International Motor Show in Geneva 
March 9–13: Alpine Skiing World Cup races in Lenzerheide
March 13: 37th Engadin Skimarathon
March 19: Saint Joseph's Day¹
March 25: Good Friday¹
March 27: Easter Sunday¹
March 28: Easter Monday¹

April
April 7: Näfelser Fahrt¹ in the Canton of Glarus, commemoration of the Battle of Näfels (1388)
April 10: Election for cantonal parliament and executive in Neuchâtel
April 18: Sechseläuten¹ in Zürich 
April 18–22: Federal Parliament special session
April 24: cantonal Landsgemeinde in Appenzell

May
May 1: May Day¹
May 1: cantonal Landsgemeinde in Glarus
May 5: Ascension Day¹
May 5: Banntag custom in the canton of Basel-Country
May 15: Pentecost¹
May 16: Whit Monday¹
May 16: Football Cup final in Basel
May 24–27: Orbit and Internet Expo in Basel 
May 26: Corpus Christi¹
May 30-June 17: Federal Parliament summer session

June
June 5: Sunday for votes and elections
June 11–19: Tour de Suisse road cycling competition 
June 15–20: Art Basel, art fair in Basel
June 17–19: 26th Eidgenössisches Jodlerfest in Aarau 
June 20-July 17: Eidgenössisches Schützenfest in Frauenfeld  
June 23: Jura Independence Day¹
June 29: St. Peter and Paul¹ in Ticino

July
July 1–16: 39th Montreux Jazz Festival in Montreux 
July 9: Commemoration of the Battle of Sempach (1386) in Lucerne

August
New year for schools/universities 2005/2006
August 1: Swiss National Day¹
August 3–13: 58th Locarno International Film Festival in Locarno 
August 15: Assumption of Mary¹
August 19–20: St.Galler Fäscht

September
September 8: Jeûne genevois¹ in Geneva
September 10–11: European Heritage Days (Journées du patrimoine)
September 10–12: Knabenschiessen¹ in Zürich 
September 18: Eidgenössischer Dank-, Buss- und Bettag; Jeûne fédéral (federal day of fasting)¹
September 19: Monday afterwards (Lundi du Jeûne)¹ in Neuchâtel and Vaud
September 19-October 7: Federal Parliament autumn session
September 21–23: 4th Standardization and Innovation in Information Technology conference in Geneva 
September 23–25: 80th Fête des Vendanges in Neuchâtel, vintage festival 
September 25: Sunday for votes and elections
September 25: St. Nikolaus of Flüe¹ in Obwalden

October
October 13–23: Olma in St. Gallen

November
November 1: All Saints¹
November 11: Gansabhauet in Sursee, local Saint Martin's Day custom
November 15: Commemoration of the Battle of Morgarten (1315) in Zug and Schwyz
November 27: Sunday for votes and elections
November 28-December 16: Federal Parliament winter session
November 28: Zibelemärit in Bern

December
December 5: Klausjagen in Küssnacht
December 7: Election of the President of the Confederation for 2006 by the Federal Parliament
December 8: Immaculate Conception¹
December 10–11: Escalade (1602) commemoration in Geneva 
December 25: Christmas¹
December 26: St. Stephen's Day¹
December: Spengler Cup in Davos, ice hockey tournament
December 31: Restoration of the Republic¹ in Geneva

Incumbents

See: List of 2005 office-holders in Switzerland

Awards 

Swiss Award 2004:
Swiss of the Year: Lotti Latrous
Culture: Bruno Ganz
Economy: Beatrice Weder di Mauro
Entertainment: Mia Aegerter
Politics: Jean Ziegler
Society: Ruedi Lüthy
Sports: Marcel Fischer
Swiss Film Prize 2005 (Schweizer Filmpreis/Prix du cinéma suisse)
Fiction: "Tout un hiver sans feu" by Greg Zglinski
Documentary: "Accordion Tribe" by Stefan Schwietert
Short film: "Cheyenne"	by Alexander Meier
Animation film: "Un'altra città" by Carlo Ippolito
Performance in a leading role: Roeland Wiesnekker in "Strähl" by Manuel Flurin Hendry
Performance in a supporting role: Johanna Bantzer in "Strähl"
Special Jury Prize: Filip Zumbrunn for camera and light in "Strähl"
Innerschweizer Kulturpreis 2005: Martin Stadler
Schweizer KleinKunstPreis 2005: Gardi Hutter
Wakker Prize 2005: SBB-CFF-FFS

Deaths
January 1?: Walter Tschudi, 71, athlete (decathlon) Swiss sportsperson of the Year 1957
January 2: Kurt Eichenberger, 83, jurist, professor at the University of Basel
January 5: Arthur Alder-Götti, 73, musician, longtime member of Original Streichmusik Alder
January 6: Jürg von Känel, 53, climber, mountain guide, writer of guide book
January 7: Ernst Deubelbeiss, 84, convicted of the murder of Armin Bannwart in 1951.
January 7: Hans Walder, 84, Prosecutor General of the Swiss Confederation (1968–1973)	
January: Valeska Lindtberg-Hirsch, 94, pianist, widow of Leopold Lindtberg
January 11: Walter J. Ammann, 88, SF DRS pioneer (1953–1980), television director
January 14: Georges Piroué, 85, writer born in La Chaux-de-Fonds
January 17: Daniel Zufferey, 35, author
January 21: Carl Schlettwein, 79, founder of Basler Afrika Bibliographien
January 24: Dölf Preisig, 64, Schweizer Illustrierte photographer
January: Marcel H. Keiser, 64?, journalist
January 29: Ephraim Kishon, 80, satirist, writer, film director
January: Donato Müller, 70, footballer (Grasshopper Zürich)
February 1: Werner Arnold, 74, cyclist well known in the 1950s
February 3: David Hönigsberg, 45, composer, music teacher and conductor
February 9: Hanno Helbling, 74, journalist, former NZZ Feuilleton editor
February 15: João Filipe Martins, 62, Angolan diplomat in Geneva
February 16: Marcello Viotti, 50, conductor
February 17: Harald Szeemann, 71, curator and art historian

See also
2005 in Swiss music

External links
:de:Feiertage in der Schweiz (Public holidays in Switzerland)
Sport 2005

 
Years of the 21st century in Switzerland
Switzerland